Worrowing Heights is a locality in the City of Shoalhaven in New South Wales, Australia. It lies west of Vincentia, which is on Jervis Bay, and north of St Georges Basin.

References

City of Shoalhaven